Reformists Front, formerly called Democracy Front and Front for Consolidation of Democracy, is an Iranian reformist political alliance of "little-known parties" formerly pivoted by Democracy Party.

History

2008 parliamentary election 

In 2008 Iranian legislative election, they formed "Popular Coalition of Reforms", consisting of 14 groups. Mostafa Kavakebian and Fatemeh Karroubi were key figures of the alliance. Other than Democracy Party, Islamic Assembly of Women and some of Islamic Iran Solidarity Party politicians –not the party itself– were notable parties of the coalition. The coalition was allied with National Trust Party and Moderation and Development Party in the election and competed with Council for Coordinating the Reforms Front's "Reformists Coalition: Friends of Khatami" list, as well as conservative United Front of Principlists and Principlists Pervasive Coalition.

2012 parliamentary election 
Led by Mostafa Kavakebian, in the 2012 Iranian legislative election they were renamed to "Reformists Front", a name similar to the "Reforms Front" —which decided not to participate in the election. Some reformist groups ruled out any cooperation with the Reformists Front, and some even labeled them as “fake reformists”. In Tehran, Rey, Shemiranat and Eslamshahr electoral district they were allied with the Worker House and endorsed 15 shared candidates. The two groups were the most notable reformist parties competing in the elections.

Democracy Party departure and front split 
In early summer 2014, Democracy Party left the front in order to be able to remain in the Council for coordinating the Reforms Front. Following the exit, a split occurred in the front. One faction believed the Deputy Secretary-General Mohammad-Javad Haghshenas takes the Secretary-General office, and the other faction elected Ali Faezi as the new Secretary-General and retained Majid Mohtashami as Spokesperson. On 26 October 2014, one faction tried to register the front in the Ministry of Interior and become the legitimate faction. In October 2014, former leader Mostafa Kavakebian criticized their decision to form a parallel reformist alliance in 2008, but defended their participation in 2012.

2016 parliamentary election 
The front issued a list for the 2016 Iranian legislative election which was 100% overlapping with the List of Hope.

Membership 
The front includes minor political parties as well as local parties and less formal groups and organizations. Groups mentioned as members of the alliance by sources include:
Freedom Party  
Iran National Union Party
Children of Iran Party
Association for Solidarity of Iran Educators, founded in 1999
Iran's Progress Party
Independent Labour Party
Political Population of Iran National Power
Population of Advocates of Law & Order, founded in 1998
Population of Followers of Tomorrow
Society of Lawyers Defending Human Rights, founded in 1998
Glorious Iran Party
Development Pioneers Party
Kermanshah Province Development Party
Mahestan Association
Association of Chaharmahal and Bakhtiari Youth
Association of Educators and Graduates of Payame Noor University
Association of Academics of University of Isfahan
Assembly of Students and Graduates of Bushehr Province
Assembly of Students and Graduates of Isfahan Province
Assembly of Students and Graduates of Golestan Province
Assembly of Students and Graduates of East Azerbaijan Province
Assembly of Students and Graduates of Ilam Province
Association for Graduates of West Azarbaijan, founded in 1998
Association for Graduates of Abu Rayhan Al-Biruni, founded in 1999
Gilan Popular Participations Party
Popular Party of Reforms

Former members 
Democracy Party (2000–2014)
Islamic Assembly of Women (2008)
Former allied groups
National Trust Party (2008)
Moderation and Development Party (2008)
Worker House (2012)

References

External links
Official website

Political party alliances in Iran
Reformist political groups in Iran
Electoral lists for Iranian legislative election, 2008
Electoral lists for Iranian legislative election, 2012